Ice hockey at the 1986 Asian Winter Games took place in the city of Sapporo, Japan. Only four nations competed in the sport: China, Japan, South Korea and North Korea.

The competition was held at the Tsukisamu Gymnasium from 1 to 8 March.

Schedule

Medalists

Results

Final standing

References
 Results of the First Winter Asian Games

External links
Results

 
1986
1986 Asian Winter Games events
1986
Winter
Ice hockey in Japan
Winter